Friendsgiving is a 2020 American comedy-drama film, written, and directed by Nicol Paone in her directorial debut, premiering on October 23, 2020, produced by Saban Films. It stars Malin Åkerman, Kat Dennings, Aisha Tyler, Chelsea Peretti, Christine Taylor, Jane Seymour, Deon Cole, Wanda Sykes, Margaret Cho, Fortune Feimster, Jack Donnelly, and Ryan Hansen. The film received generally negative reviews.

Plot
Molly, a movie actress, and Abby are best friends who have planned to spend a quiet Thanksgiving together. Molly is mom to a five-month old baby boy and is going through a divorce, while Abby, who came out as lesbian when she was 29 years old, has spent the past year getting over being dumped by her first girlfriend.

What was supposed to be a low-key holiday with just the two of them becomes a large Friendsgiving dinner party after Molly invites her fling boyfriend, Jeff, to stay for dinner, as well as her and Abby's mutual friend Lauren with her husband and children. Meanwhile, Lauren invites a few single lesbians to the party to help Abby find a new love interest and start dating again.

Molly's estranged mother, Helen, also arrives unannounced from Sweden to stay with her, mend mother-daughter fences, and acquaint herself with her grandchild. Unbeknownst to Molly, Helen has invited Gunnar, a former boyfriend of Molly who stayed in touch with Helen through Facebook.

Other surprise friends and guests also arrive, including Claire, a recently-certified shaman who identifies as a "shawoman", Rick and his new wife Brianne who cannot speak audibly due to Botox injections, and Gus, a gay man whose brother has been missing for seven years.

Cast
 Malin Åkerman as Molly
 Kat Dennings as Abby
 Jane Seymour as Helen
 Aisha Tyler as Lauren
 Chelsea Peretti as Claire
 Christine Taylor as Brianne
 Deon Cole as Dan
 Ryan Hansen as Gunnar
 Wanda Sykes, Margaret Cho and Fortune Feimster as Fairy Gay Mothers
 Jack Donnelly as Jeff
 River Butcher as Denim
 Andrew Santino as Rick
 Dana DeLorenzo as Barbara
 Everly and Savannah Sucher as Eden
 Rose Abdoo as Linda, Abby’s mother
 Joe Lando as Handsome Man
 Mike Rose as Gus

Production
In May 2018, it was announced Malin Åkerman, Kat Dennings, Jane Seymour, Aisha Tyler, Chelsea Peretti, Christine Taylor, Deon Cole, Ryan Hansen, Wanda Sykes and Margaret Cho, had been cast in the film, with Nicol Paone directing from a screenplay she wrote. Malin Åkerman, Ben Stiller, Nicholas Weinstock and Harmon Saleem will produce the film, under their Red Hour Films and Endeavor Content banners, respectively.

Principal photography began in May 2018. Production concluded on June 4, 2018.

Release
In November 2019, Saban Films acquired distribution rights to the film. In February 2020, Vertical Entertainment acquired U.K. distribution rights to the film. It was released on October 23, 2020.

Critical response

Home media
The film became available as video on demand in the United States on Netflix on January 21, 2021.

References

External links

 

2020 films
2020 comedy-drama films
2020 directorial debut films
2020 LGBT-related films
2020s English-language films
American comedy-drama films
Lesbian-related films
LGBT-related comedy-drama films
Thanksgiving in films
Films set in Los Angeles
Films produced by Ben Stiller
Red Hour Productions films
Saban Films films
Vertical Entertainment films
2020s American films
English-language comedy-drama films